Solanone is an unsaturated ketone, an organic chemical used as a fragrance.

It was discovered in 1967 by Johnson and Nicholson, American tobacconists. It is naturally present in tobacco leaves. As the extraction of natural product is expensive, it is currently being mostly manufactured synthetically. It is also found in blackcurrant buds.

Solanone is used as a cigarette additive. It enhances the fragrance of tobacco, improving the sensoric qualities of cigarettes. It can also compensate the loss of flavor associated to procedures lowering tar content.

References

Ketones
Perfumes